The lesser goldfinch (Spinus psaltria) is a very small songbird of the Americas. Together with its relatives the American goldfinch and Lawrence's goldfinch, it forms the New World goldfinch clade in the genus Spinus.

As is the case for all three New World goldfinches (and some of their siskin relatives), lesser goldfinch males have a black forehead, which females lack. Males in this species vary strikingly in back color across their range, from green in western North America to black from Texas south to South America. Five subspecies are often recognized.

Taxonomy
The lesser goldfinch was formally described by the American zoologist Thomas Say in 1822 under the binomial name Fringilla psaltria. The specific epithet psaltria is Ancient Greek for a female harpist. The type locality is Colorado Springs, Colorado. The lesser goldfinch is now placed in the genus Spinus that was introduced in 1816 by the German naturalist Carl Ludwig Koch.

Five subspecies are recognised:
 S. p. hesperophilus (Oberholser, 1903) – west USA and northwest Mexico
 S. p. witti Grant, PR, 1964 – Tres Marias Islands (off west Mexico)
 S. p. psaltria (Say, 1822) – west-central USA to south-central Mexico
 S. p. jouyi (Ridgway, 1898) – southeast Mexico and northwest Belize
 S. p. colombianus (Lafresnaye, 1843) – south Mexico to Peru and Venezuela

Description
This petite species is not only the smallest North American Spinus finch, it may be the smallest true finch in the world. Some sources list more subtropical Spinus species as slightly smaller on average, including the Andean siskin (Spinus spinescens). There is a slight northwest-southeast cline in size, with the largest birds from Mexico and further south being up to one-fifth larger than the smallest from the extreme northwest of its range; this effect is more pronounced in females. There is also considerable variation in the amount of black on the head and back in males and thus five subspecies have been proposed. But this variation, too, seems to be simple and clinal changes in allele frequency and thus the "subspecies" might be better considered colour morphs or geographic forms.

Males are easily recognized by their bright yellow underparts and big white patches in the tail (outer rectrices) and on the wings (the base of the primaries). They range from having solid black from the back to the upper head including the ear-coverts to having these regions medium green; each of the back, crown and ear regions varies in darkness rather independently though; as a rule, the ears are not darker than the rest. In most of the range, dark birds termed psaltria (the Arkansas black-backed goldfinch) predominate. The light birds are termed hesperophilus (the green-backed goldfinch) and are most common in the far western U.S. and northwestern Mexico.

The zone in which both light and dark males occur on a regular basis is broadest in the north and extends across the width of the Rocky Mountains and the Sierra Madre Occidental ranges. It reaches the Pacific Coast in southern Sonora to northern Sinaloa, roughly between the area of Ciudad Obregón to Culiacán. In the United States, the most diverse array of phenotypes can be found in Colorado and New Mexico. East of the 106th meridian west in southwestern Texas, as well as in most of Mexico, almost all males have black backs. S. p. colombianus, found east and south of the Isthmus of Tehuantepec, is a richer yellow below in males. This subspecies, as well as the even yellower S. p. jouyi from the Yucatán Peninsula and adjacent regions of Mexico and S. p. witti from the Tres Marías Islands off Nayarit require more study, especially since at least the former two also seem to be significantly larger and longer-billed.

Females' and immatures' upperparts are more or less grayish olive-green; their underparts are yellowish, buffier in immatures. They have only a narrow strip of white on the wings (with other white markings in some forms) and little or no white on the tail. They are best distinguished from other members of the genus by the combination of small size, upperparts without white or yellow, and dark gray bill. In all plumages, this bird can easily be taken for a New World warbler if the typical finch bill is not seen well.

Like other goldfinches, it has an undulating flight in which it frequently gives a call: in this case, a harsh chig chig chig. Another distinctive call is a very high-pitched, drawn-out whistle, often rising from one level pitch to another (teeeyeee) or falling (teeeyooo). The song is a prolonged warble or twitter, more phrased than that of the American goldfinch, often incorporating imitations of other species.

Distribution and habitat

This American goldfinch ranges from the southwestern United States (near the coast, as far north as extreme southwestern Washington) to Venezuela and Peru. It migrates from the colder parts of its U.S. range.

The lesser goldfinch often occurs in flocks or at least loose associations. It utilizes almost any habitat with trees or shrubs except for dense forest, and is common and conspicuous in many areas, often coming near houses. It is common at feeders in the Southwest United States and will come almost anywhere with thistle sock feeders. Flocks of at least six birds will often be seen at feeders. It feeds mostly on tree buds and weed seeds; geophagy has been observed in this species.

The nesting season is in summer in the temperate parts of its range; in the tropics it apparently breeds all-year round, perhaps less often in September and October. It lays three or four bluish white eggs in a cup nest made of fine plant materials such as lichens, rootlets, and strips of bark, placed in a bush or at low or middle levels in a tree.

The moult occurs in two different patterns which coincide with the blackness of the upperparts quite well. Here too is a broad zone of intergradation. Pacific birds moult after breeding, and females shed a few body feathers before breeding too. Juvenile males shed more remiges than females when moulting into adult plumage. East of the 106th meridian west, birds moult strongly before breeding and replace another quantity of feathers afterwards, and post-juvenal moult does not differ significantly between the sexes. However, this seems dependent on the differing rainfall regimes; simply put, birds at least anywhere in the North American range moult most of their plumage at the end of the dry season and may replace more feathers at the end of the wet season.

Considered a Species of Least Concern by the IUCN due to its vast range, it nonetheless seems to be declining locally. For example, it is rare in the Ecuadorean Andes foothills.

References

Sources
 Cisneros-Heredia, Diego F. (2006): "Notes on breeding, behaviour and distribution of some birds in Ecuador." Bulletin of the British Ornithologists' Club 126 (2): 153–164. PDF fulltext
 Delgado-V., Carlos A. (2006): "Observación de geofagia por el Jiguero Aliblanco Carduelis psaltria (Fringillidae)." ["Report of geophagy in the Lesser Goldfinch C. psaltria (Fringillidae)".] Boletín de la Sociedad Antioqueña de Ornitología 16 (2): 31–34. [Spanish with English abstract] PDF fulltext
 Howell, Steven N.G. & Webb, Sophie (1995): A Guide to the Birds of Mexico and Northern Central America. Oxford University Press, Oxford & New York. 
 Peterson, Roger Tory; Peterson, Virginia Marie; National Audubon Society; National Wildlife Federation & Roger Tory Peterson Institute (1990): A field guide to western birds: a completely new guide to field marks of all species found in North America west of the 100th meridian and north of Mexico. Houghton Mifflin, Boston. 
 Quatro, John (2007): Siskins of the World. Retrieved January 10, 2008.
 Sibley, David Allen (2000): The Sibley Guide to Birds. Alfred A. Knopf, New York. 
 Willoughby, Ernest J. (2007): Geographic variation in color, measurements, and molt of the Lesser Goldfinch in North America does not support subspecific designation [English with Spanish abstract]. The Condor 109 (2): 419–436.

External links

 Lesser goldfinch Species Account - Cornell Lab of Ornithology
 Lesser goldfinch - Carduelis psaltria - USGS Patuxent Bird Identification InfoCenter
 
 
 

lesser goldfinch
Birds of Central America
Birds of the Northern Andes
Fauna of the California chaparral and woodlands
Least concern biota of North America
Least concern biota of the United States
Native birds of the Southwestern United States
Native birds of the Western United States
lesser goldfinch
Taxa named by Thomas Say